The National Communications Commission (NCC) is an independent statutory agency of Executive Yuan of the Republic of China (Taiwan) responsible for regulating the development of the telecommunication and broadcasting industries, promoting competition and consumer protection, and regulating licensing, radio frequency and spectrum, programming content, communications standards and specifications in Taiwan. The current Chairperson is Chan Ting-I.

History
The NCC is an independent statutory agency created on 22 February 2006 to regulate the information, communications and broadcasting industry in Taiwan.

NCC was tasked with the responsibility to ensure a level playing field in competition in the communications industry, consumer protection, privacy rights, and the development of universal service for remote and rural regions. It also develop new standards for emerging technologies that will improve access, lower cost and deliver services to remote areas.

Organizational structure

 Department of Planning
 Department of Telecommunications Administration
 Department of Television and Radio Administration
 Department of Resources and Technologies
 Department of Content Affairs
 Department of Legal Affairs
 Northern Regional Regulatory Department
 Central Regional Regulatory Department
 Southern Regional Regulatory Department
 Secretariat
 Personnel Office
 Budget, Accounting and Statistics Office
 Civil Service Ethics Office

Chairpersons
 Su Yeong-chin (22 February 2006 - 31 July 2008)
 Bonnie Peng (1 August 2008 - 31 July 2010)
 Herng Su (1 August 2010 - 31 July 2012)
 Howard S.H. Shyr (1 August 2012 - 31 July 2016)
 Chan Ting-i (1 August 2016 - 3 April 2019)
 Chen Yaw-shyang (陳耀祥) (4 April 2019 -) (acting)

See also
 Executive Yuan
 Press Freedom Index
 Censorship in Taiwan
 Media of Taiwan

References

External links

 National Communications Commission, R.O.C. 
 Type Approval Services for Taiwan for 315 MHz; 433 MHz; 2,4 GHz; 24 GHz; 77 GHz; GSM; UMTS; LTE; Wi-Fi devices; Bluetooth devices; Zigbee devices; WiMAX devices; RFID

2006 establishments in Taiwan
Executive Yuan
Government agencies established in 2006
Communications authorities